Paulding Northwest Atlanta Airport (formerly known as Silver Comet Field, and Paulding County Regional Airport)  is a small public-use airport in Paulding County, Georgia, United States. It is owned by the Paulding County Board of Commissioners, and is included in the National Plan of Integrated Airport Systems for 2011–2015, which categorized it as a general aviation facility.

Although many U.S. airports use the same three-letter location identifier for the FAA and IATA, this facility is assigned PUJ by the FAA but has no designation from the IATA (which assigned PUJ to Punta Cana International Airport in the Dominican Republic).

History 
In 1975, in anticipation of a second international airport, the city of Atlanta purchased  of land in Paulding for $925 per acre. In early 2007, the county purchased  of the property for the new general aviation airport.

Paulding County is unserved by either rapid transit or freeways.

Construction was completed in late 2008. It is the ninth local airport in metro Atlanta, and the first new jet-capable airport in Georgia since 1975. To date, more than $70 million has gone into the construction and development of the airport: roughly $10 million from Paulding County directly, $55 million in Federal Aviation Administration grants, and $7 million in state funding. It is anticipated that economic development activity at the airport could result in more than $350 million in annual economic activity and thousands of jobs for Paulding County over the next decade.

2012 hangar collapse 
On February 22, 2012, one worker was killed and another was injured by the collapse of the second hangar during construction work. Construction of this hangar had been previously delayed in December 2011, when it was discovered that the hangar's concrete slab was not level.

2012 tornado 
On the night of March 2, 2012, during the tornado outbreak of March 2–3, 2012, the airport was struck by an EF3 tornado that tore a  path across the county. Several million dollars in damage was done, including $1.5 million to the facility, and $5 million to the aircraft parked and stored there, most of which were destroyed (between 18 and 23 aircraft). The hangar was so severely damaged, it had to be torn down and rebuilt. The airport was closed until cleanup and essential repairs were completed.

Repairs to the terminal building were completed in October 2012. The airport became operational with aircraft activity near levels documented prior to the March 2012 tornado, though the airport's only charter service ceased operations. .

Attempted privatization 
On October 4, 2013, Paulding County announced a Public Private Partnership with Propeller Investments, llc (doing business as Silver Comet Terminal Partners, llc) to further develop the airport, with an intent to provide commercial passenger services. This was opposed by local residents, to whom the head of the Paulding County Airport Authority had previously promised that the airport would remain a general aviation airport. Consequently, residents filed several lawsuits addressing violations of Georgia's freedom of information laws, and an ultra vires suit against the Paulding County Industrial Building Authority for overextending its authority. Some of these lawsuits were filed by attorneys associated with Delta Air Lines.

In October 2013, residents filed a legal challenge against bond funding for a taxiway expansion, and a second legal challenge in November, questioning the Federal Aviation Administration (FAA) environmental approvals of the planned expansions. In December, the court ruled in favor of the airport and county in the bond funding case; residents pledged to appeal. A settlement was announced for the FAA case, calling for an environmental assessment, postponing the commercialization of the airport. In January 2014, residents filed a third legal challenge regarding airport leases and a loan funding the taxiway expansion.

By 2015, anti-privatization politicians had been elected to the Paulding County Commission, straining the private industry relations, and by 2018, the Airport Authority terminated the partnership. In 2021, a judge upheld the county's cancellation of the agreements and the companies appealed.

Facilities 
It has one southeast–northwest runway designated 13/31 which measures .

A new,  terminal building was opened in May 2010, along with the airport's new fixed-base operator, Paulding Jet Center. The airport also has an AWOS weather station, a rotating beacon, and pilot-activated runway lighting. The runway elevation averages  AMSL, ±3 feet (±1m). PUJ offers an ILS and GPS approach on runway 31. The National Weather Service did not carry observations for this location until late 2012 or early 2013.

On October 1, 2020, the Paulding Airport FBO (fixed-base operator) took the place of the former Paulding Jet Center FBO. This new FBO is under the direction of the Paulding County Airport Authority.

References

External links
 PauldingAirport.com
 

Airports in Georgia (U.S. state)
Buildings and structures in Paulding County, Georgia
Transportation in Paulding County, Georgia
Airports established in 2008
2008 establishments in Georgia (U.S. state)